Speaking of the Devil (Italian: Un piede in paradiso, also known as Standing In Paradise) is a 1991 Italian comedy film directed by Enzo Barboni. It is the last collaboration between Barboni and Bud Spencer with the pairs sons co-writing the film together; Spencer's daughter also plays a role in the film. 

The role of Victor was originally intended to be played by Terence Hill, but Hill had to refuse as still being engaged on the set of the Lucky Luke TV series. The film was filmed in Florida.

Plot
When Bull Webster, a Miami cab driver wins a very large amount in a lottery, Heaven and Earth express enough interest in the event to send their agents to inspire or corrupt Bull.

Cast 
 Bud Spencer: Bull Webster
 Carol Alt: Veronica Flame
 Thierry Lhermitte: Victor
 Ian Bannen: Luzifer
 Jean Sorel: Holy father
 Sharon Madden: Betty
 Sean Arnold: Morrison
 Riccardo Pizzuti: Taxi driver (red cab)
 Diamante Spencer: Bull's daughter

References

External links

1991 films
1991 comedy films
Films shot in Florida
Italian comedy films
The Devil in film
1990s Italian films